Isild Le Besco (born 22 November 1982) is a French actress and filmmaker. She is of French and Algerian descent on her mother's side, and Vietnamese and Breton on her father's.

She has starred in many films, including Sade (2000), a French film starring Daniel Auteuil, and in The Good Heart, directed by Dagur Kari. The third of five children of actress and journalist Catherine Belkhodja, she grew up in the world of theatre and film. All her siblings as adults are also involved in these worlds as actors, directors, cameramen, and producers.

Filmography

Feature films 
 1990: Lacenaire by Francis Girod
 1996: La Puce by Emmanuelle Bercot
 1999: Girls Can't Swim by Anne-Sophie Birot
 2000: Adieu Babylone by Frédéric Frydmann
 2000: Sade by Benoît Jacquot
 2001: Roberto Succo by Cédric Kahn
 2002: Un Moment de bonheur by Antoine Santana
 2002: La Repentie by Laetitia Masson
 2002: Adolphe by Benoît Jacquot
 2003: Le Cout de la vie by Philippe Le Guay
 2004: A tout de suite by Benoît Jacquot
 2004:  by Benoît Jacquot
 2005: Backstage by Emmanuelle Bercot
 2005: La Ravisseuse by Antoine Santana
 2006: Wild Camp (Camping sauvage) by Christophe Ali and Nicolas Bonilauri
 2006: L'Intouchable by Benoît Jacquot
 2006: U (voix de la princesse) by Serge Elissalde and Grégoire Solotareff
 2007: Pas douce by Jeanne Waltz
 2008: Enfances
 2009: Je Te Mangerais by Sophie Laloy
 2009: The Good Heart
 2010: Deep in the Woods
 2014: Manhattan Romance
 2014: Les brigands
 2014: Portrait of the Artist
 2014: The New Girlfriend
 2015: Mon roi

Short films
 1999: Cinematon #995 by Gérard Courant
 1991: Place des Vosges by Catherine Belkhodja
 1997: Anniversaires by Rosette
 1997: Kub Valium by Marine Ledu
 1997: Les Vacances by Emmanuelle Bercot
 1997: Coquillettes by Joséphine Flasseur
 1998: Les amis de Ninon by Rosette
 2000: Des Anges by Julien Leloup
 2003: Quelqu'un vous aime by Emmanuelle Bercot
 2003: Dans la foret noire by Joséphine Flasseur
 2016: Cinématon #2944 by Gérard Courant

Television
 1987: Reflets perdus du miroir by Catherine Belkhodja
 1999: Une Fille rebelle
 1999: Le Choix d’Élodie by Emmanuelle Bercot
 2003: La Maison du canal (série ’'Maigret)
 2003: Les Mythes urbainsScreenwriter
 1998: Demi-tarif 2004: Charly 2010: Bas-fondsDirector
 2004: Demi-tarif 2007: Enfances co-réalisé par Safy Nebbou, Isild Le Besco, Joana Hadjithomas & Khalil Joreige, Corinne Garfin, Ismaël Ferroukhi et Yann Le Gal
 2007: Charly 
 2010: Bas-fonds 2014: Ponts de Sarajevo (Documentary)

Theater
 2007: La Double Inconstance by Marivaux au Théâtre National de Chaillot, mise en scene by Christian Colin with Grégoire Colin

Other media
 "Marais," narrator—an audio walking tour of the Paris neighborhood. Created by Soundwalk

Awards
 2000: Prix du meilleur scénario Junior au festival de Paris pour son premier scénario: Demi-tarif 2001: Étoile d'or de la révélation féminine for Sade, by Benoît Jacquot.
 2001: Nomination: 7 d'or pour le Choix d'Elodie
 2001: Nomination: César Award du Meilleur espoir féminin pour Sade
 2001: Lumières Award for Most Promising Actress for Sade 2002: Nomination: César du Meilleur espoir féminin pour Roberto Succo
 2004: Prix spécial du Jury a l'European first film festival d’Angers pour Demi-tarif 2004: Prix Procirep. Premiers plans. Angers pour Demi-tarif 2004: Special prize of Jury du festival de Séoul pour Demi-tarif 2005: Grand Prix du Jury. Crossing Europe Festival. Linz pour Demi-tarif 2004: Nomination pour le prix Louis Deluc pour Demi-tarif 2006: Prix Marcello Mastroianni a la Mostra de Venise (best new actress)

References

External links

 
 Official site
 Site with photos and updates
 Isild Le Besco, actor-director
 Portrait in Le Monde Wildlife: Isild Le Besco, Scott Foundas, Film Comment'', January/February 2011
 Actresses of France – site with photos and updates
 Isild Le Besco at Actrices Françaises Fan Site

1982 births
Living people
French people of Algerian descent
French people of Breton descent
French people of Vietnamese descent
French stage actresses
French film actresses
French television actresses
20th-century French actresses
21st-century French actresses
French women film directors
French women screenwriters
French screenwriters
Film directors from Paris
French film producers
French women film producers
French film editors
Most Promising Actress Lumières Award winners
Marcello Mastroianni Award winners
French women film editors